The Pond is Kathryn Williams tenth studio album, released by One Little Indian Records on 28 May 2012. The Pond consists of Kathryn Williams, Simon Edwards and Ginny Clee, with the project slowly developing over a two-year period. The album was mixed by Portishead's Adrian Utley.

Reception
The Pond received positive reviews from critics upon release. On Metacritic, the album holds a score of 71/100 based on 5 reviews, indicating "generally favorable reviews."

MusicOMH, giving the album 4 out of 5 stars, suggested that it is "an excellent example of an established artist making a real step forward".

Track listing 
 All songs written by The Pond except  Bebop - The Pond \ Vincent \ Davis \ Kirsch  Mixed by Adrian Utley
 Carved
 Circle Round A Tree
 The River
 Pass Us By
 The Art Of Doing Nothing
 Memory Let Down
 Bebop
 Heard Shoulder
 End Of The Pier
 Evening Star
 Aim

Personnel 
 Kathryn Williams
 Simon Edwards
 Ginny Clee
 Kirsch - rap on 'Bebop'
 Johnny Enright - trombone
 Darren Robinson - guitar on 'Aim'

References 

2012 albums
Kathryn Williams albums
One Little Independent Records albums